Turbo extra Tennis is a shortened form of tennis in which players play in a fast knockout tournament which consists of five matches of 30 minutes each, taking place over the course of a single afternoon. The idea was launched in London by former Wimbledon champion Pat Cash, American world number nine James Blake and English Entrepreneur Andi White.

Betfair Turbo Tennis at London

The first tournament took place on 15 September 2007 at the O2 Arena in London. It featured six players. The winner received prize money of £50,000. The first tournament at the O2 arena was won by Andy Murray, defeating Goran Ivanisevic in the final.

Players competing in the inaugural tournament were;

 Andy Murray - then world number 19 and British number 1
 Pat Cash - Former Wimbledon Champion (1987)
 James Blake - then world number 6
 Goran Ivanišević - Former Wimbledon Champion (2001)
 Jamie Murray - 2007 Wimbledon mixed doubles champion, then British number 1 doubles player
 Greg Rusedski - Former world number 4, replaced Tim Henman

Betfair Turbo Tennis at Saragossa (Spain)

The tournament took place on October 27, 2007. Players competing in the inaugural tournament were Rafael Nadal, David Ferrer, Carlos Moyá, Sergi Bruguera, Pat Cash and Joachim Johansson. The winner was David Ferrer, who beats Rafael Nadal in the final (7/5).

Rules
Unlike regular tennis, games are set to a 30-minute time limit with a klaxon on the fifteenth minute to signify a change of ends from the next game onwards. If games are level after 30 minutes the winner is decided by a sudden death point, but there have been some changes and you have to win 2 out of 3 sudden death points to win the match. Other main differences include a 15-second maximum time limit for serves which, if exceeded, results in the player losing the point automatically; lets on serves are also played.

References

External links
Sporting Life article
BBC Report

Forms of tennis
Exhibition tennis tournaments